"I'm Stickin' with You" is a song written by Jimmy Bowen and Buddy Knox and performed by Jimmy Bowen with The Rhythm Orchids. It reached #9 on the US R&B chart and #14 on the US pop chart in 1957. The song was originally released as the B-side to Knox's 1956 song "Party Doll" and was featured on their 1957 album, Jimmy Bowen.

The single's B-side, "Ever Lovin' Fingers", reached #63 on the US pop chart.

Other versions
The Four Lads released a version of the song in Germany as the B-side to their 1956 single "Round and Round".
The Fontane Sisters released a version of the song in May 1957 which reached #72 on the US pop chart.
Roy Brown released a version of the song as the B-side to his 1957 single "Party Doll".

References

1956 songs
1957 singles
Jimmy Bowen songs
The Four Lads songs
Roulette Records singles
Dot Records singles